The term "Roses rivalry" can refer to sporting rivalries between teams from the English counties of Lancashire and Yorkshire. The name of the rivalry is derived from the historic Wars of the Roses which was fought between the House of Lancaster and the House of York. 

The term has also been used to describe various sporting fixtures:

Cricket: Roses Match – between Lancashire CCC and Yorkshire CCC.

Football: Roses Derby – between Leeds United and Manchester United
Also describes games between other traditional East Lancashire and West Yorkshire clubs; Bradford City vs Burnley, Halifax Town vs Rochdale, and Huddersfield Town vs Oldham Athletic being well known examples.

Rugby League: War of the Roses – was an annual rugby league series played between professional players of Lancashire and Yorkshire. 
More recently, the term has described the rivalry between Leeds Rhinos and Wigan Warriors.
Similar to in football, Roses Derby exists in rugby league, between traditional East Lancashire clubs of Oldham and Rochdale, and West Yorkshire clubs of Huddersfield and Halifax.

University Varsity: Roses Tournament – an annual varsity tournament between the students of Lancaster University and the University of York.

See also
Liverpool–Manchester rivalry - the rivalry between the two cities located in the historic county of Lancashire.

Sport in Yorkshire
Sport in Lancashire
Sports rivalries in the United Kingdom